Autumn Mist is an original novel written by David A. McIntee and based on the long-running British science fiction television series Doctor Who. It features the Eighth Doctor, Sam and Fitz.

Plot
The Doctor investigates an ancient force interfering with the Battle of the Bulge.

External links
The Cloister Library - Autumn Mist

Reviews
The Whoniverse's review on Autumn Mist

1999 British novels
1999 science fiction novels
Eighth Doctor Adventures
Novels by David A. McIntee
Novels set during World War II